Íþróttabandalag Vestmannaeyja (ÍBV) is an Icelandic multi-sports district association from Vestmannaeyjar off the south coast of Iceland. It was founded in 1903 as Knattspyrnufélag Vestmannaeyja by Björgúlfur Ólafsson, military doctor for the Dutch army. It was soon renamed to Knattspyrnufélag Vestmannaeyja (KV) and then to Íþróttabandalag Vestmannaeyja (ÍBV) héraðssamband in 1945. ÍBV played as KV in the first Icelandic first league tournament in 1912.

There have been formed several association entities with the ÍBV name to manage various of sports. ÍBV-Íþróttafélag was founded in 1996 to manage football and handball when the youth team clubs Þór and Týr, that where subbrands to KV and then ÍBV for the youth coaching only, where merged. Sundfélag ÍBV was founded in 1977 to manage swimming. Körfuknattleiksfélag ÍBV is association founded around basketball in 1995 after 9 basketball less years at the youth club Týr. Blakfélag ÍBV and Frjálsíþróttafélag ÍBV are younger association entities that also use the name from the sport district association in Vestmannaeyjar as identity.

Football

Men's football

ÍBV men's football team has won the Icelandic championship three times, in 1979, 1997 and 1998. It currently plays in the top-tier Úrvalsdeild karla.

Women's football

ÍBV women's football team has played in the top-tier Úrvalsdeild kvenna since 2011. It has won the Icelandic Cup twice, in 2004 and 2017.

Handball

Men's handball
ÍBV men's handball team won the national championship in 2014 and 2018. On 24 December 2018, the team's goalkeeper, Kolbeinn Aron Arnarson, died at his home at the age of 29.

EHF records

Women's handball

ÍBV women's handball team has won the national championship four times, in 2000, 2003, 2004 and 2006.

Basketball

Men's basketball

Honors
 Division II (2):
1977, 19991
1As ÍV

Notable coaches
 James Booker 1978

References

External links
 Official website

 
Football clubs in Iceland
Basketball teams in Iceland
Association football clubs established in 1903
Vestmannaeyjar
1900s establishments in Iceland